Shurani (also Romanized as Shūrānī; also known as Shūrūni) is a village in Golashkerd Rural District, in the Central District of Faryab County, Kerman Province, Iran. At the 2006 census, its population was 167, in 32 families.

References 

Populated places in Faryab County